Heine Strathmann was a German sprint canoeist who competed in the late 1930s. He won a gold medal in the K-4 1000 m event at the 1938 ICF Canoe Sprint World Championships in Vaxholm.

References

German male canoeists
Possibly living people
Year of birth missing
ICF Canoe Sprint World Championships medalists in kayak